Mohyliv-Podilskyi is a city in the Mohyliv-Podilskyi Raion of the Vinnytsia Oblast, Ukraine. Administratively, Mohyliv-Podilskyi is incorporated as a town of regional significance. It also serves as the administrative center of Mohyliv-Podilskyi Raion, one of twenty-seven districts of Vinnytsia Oblast, though it is not a part of the district. It is located in the historic region of Podolia, on the border with Bessarabia, Moldova, along the left bank of the Dniester river. On the opposite side of the river lies the Moldovan town of Otaci, and the two municipalities are connected to each other by a bridge. Population:

History

Polish period 
The first mention of the town dates from 1595. The owner of the town, Moldavian hospodar Ieremia Movilă (from which the name Mohyliv, Moghilău/Movilău in Romanian) bestowed it as a dowry gift to his daughter, who married into the Potocki family of Polish nobility. At that time, the groom named the town Movilǎu in honor of his father-in-law. In the first quarter of the 17th century, Mohyliv became one of the largest towns in Podolia. It was part of the Podolian Voivodeship of the Lesser Poland Province of the Polish Crown. It was a multi-ethnic border town composed of Poles, Greeks, Armenians, Serbs, Vlachs and Bosniaks. In the 18th century the main churches of the town were built: the Polish-Armenian Church of the Visitation of the Blessed Virgin Mary and the Greek St. Nicholas Church. Polish rule was interrupted by Ottoman rule as part of Podolia Eyalet. During Ottoman rule, it was nahiya centre of Kamaniçe sanjak as Mıhaylov.

Russian period 

The town was annexed by Russia after the 1793 Second Partition of Poland. After the restoration of Polish independence, Mohyliv was briefly captured by the Poles under the command of General Franciszek Krajowski in 1919, but it ultimately fell to the Soviet Union. In 1937, during the Polish Operation of the NKVD, the Soviets destroyed the Polish Church of the Visitation of the Blessed Virgin Mary.

Romanian period 

Mohyliv-Podilskyi was occupied by Romanian and German troops in July 1941 and incorporated into the Romanian-ruled Transnistria Governorate. Soon thereafter, thousands of Jews in the town were murdered by the occupiers.
Mohyliv-Podilskyi soon became a transit camp for Jews expelled from Bessarabia and Bukovina to Transnistria. From September 1941 to February 1942 more than 55,000 deportees came through the town. Thousands of people were jammed into the transit camp and treated cruelly by the Romanian guards. Many Jews were not allowed to stay in Mohyliv-Podilskyi; thousands were forced to travel by foot to nearby villages and towns. Some convoys were sent to the Pechora concentration camp. The 15,000 who were initially permitted to stay in the town organized themselves into groups. Some 2,000—3,000 were given residence permits, while the rest lived in constant fear of being deported into the Transnistrian interior for forced labor.

In December 1943 over 3,000 Jews were allowed to return to Romania, and in March 1944, Jewish leaders in Bucharest got permission to bring back 1,400 orphans. Mohyliv-Podilskyi was liberated that month; many Jewish men were immediately drafted by the Soviet army. Many who stayed in the city were killed by German bombs. Most of the deportees were allowed to return to Romania in the spring of 1945.

Ukrainian period 
Mohyliv-Podilskyi has been part of Ukraine since August 24, 1991.

On November 10, 2016, in Mohyliv-Podilskyi, a memorial to the heroes of border guards who died in 1941 was opened.

Geography 
The city is located in the southwest of the Vinnytsia region in the ravine formed by the Dniester River and other ravines (Karpivskyi yar), which are formed by the rivers that enter the Dniester basin (Derlo, Nemia, etc.). During the period of snow melting and after rains, temporary drains flow along the bottoms of the beams and the slopes of the ravines.

The average height above sea level is 80 m.

Climate

Economy 
Now working in the city:

 Mohyliv-Podilsky Machine-Building Plant;
 metalworking plants;
 light and food industry enterprises, etc.

Notable people
 Boris Bazhanov (1900–1982), Stalin's personal secretary who later defected
 Witold Maliszewski (1873–1939), a Polish composer, professor of the Warsaw Conservatory, was born in Mohyliv-Podilskyi.
 Samuel Yellin (1884–1940), American master blacksmith and metal designer, born in Mohyliv-Podilskyi
Adella Kean Zametkin (1863–1931), American socialist and writer, was born in Mohyliv-Podilskyi

Gallery

International relations

Twin towns — sister cities
Mohyliv-Podilskyi is twinned with:

  Bakhmut, Ukraine
  Koziatyn, Ukraine
  Końskie, Poland
  Połaniec, Poland
  Środa Wielkopolska, Poland
  Bălți, Moldova
  Pitești, Romania
  Šaľa, Slovakia  
  Cavriglia, Italy

References

External links

 Mohyliv-Podilskyi, article originally appeared in the Encyclopedia of Ukraine, vol. 3 (1993).

 
Cities in Vinnytsia Oblast
Moldova–Ukraine border crossings
Cities of regional significance in Ukraine
Populated places on the Dniester River in Ukraine
Podolia Voivodeship
Cossack Hetmanate
Mogilyovsky Uyezd (Podolian Governorate)
Holocaust locations in Ukraine